Christopher Weekes (died 1596) was an English politician.

He was a Member (MP) of the Parliament of England for Salisbury in 1584, 1586 and 1589.

References

Year of birth missing
1596 deaths
English MPs 1584–1585
English MPs 1586–1587
English MPs 1589